Azfar Rehman is a Pakistani model, TV host and actor. 

He has acted in Dugdugi, Ladies Park, Sitamgar, Baityaan, Mehar Bano aur Shah Bano, Noor Pur Ki Rani, Mohabbat Rooth Jaye Toh and Phir Chand Pe Dastak. He also played the roles of Sheharyar in Aatish and Raheel in Qadam Qadam Ishq. 

He also hosted three seasons of the reality show Miss Veet Pakistan.

He has been hosting the 'Morning Star with Azfar Rehman' on TV One since January 2022.

Personal life 
Of Kashmiri descent, Rehman was born in Karachi on 7 June 1987.

Career 

He started his career as a model for commercials when he was 16 and, in 2006, he got his TV break as the host of a celebrity talk show called Spotlight with Azfar Rehman, before turning to acting, describing himself as a method actor. 

He made his acting debut with the ARY Digital serial Kaisa Yeh Junoon, in 2007.

Filmography

Television

Anthology series

Telefilms

Films

Accolades

References

External links
 
 

Living people
Pakistani television hosts
Pakistani male models
Pakistani male television actors
Male actors from Karachi
Pakistani people of Kashmiri descent
Kashmiri male models
1987 births